Sierra de Orihuela is a  long mountain range in the Vega Baja del Segura comarca, Valencian Community, Spain. Its highest point is Peña de Orihuela (634 m). This range is named after the town of Orihuela, located at the feet of the mountains. The western end of the range is within the limits of the Santomera municipal term, in the Region of Murcia.

These conspicuous limestone mountains rise abruptly from the low Segura River Valley floor and have some very steep cliffs popular with rock climbers, like "La Pared Negra". There is very little vegetation on the arid mountain slopes and both physically and geologically the Sierra de Orihuela is similar to the Sierra de Callosa range located only 2.6 km to the east. Smoother Sierra de Hurchillo is located 4.8 km to the south

See also
Mountains of the Valencian Community
Sierra de Callosa

References

External links

Geoelx - Sierra de Orihuela
Hiking in Sierra de Orihuela
Pared Negra - Orihuela

Orihuela
Orihuela
Vega Baja del Segura